Malajnica is a village in the municipality of Negotin, Serbia. According to the 2002 census, the village has a population of 683 people.

Ethnic groups (2002 census)
Serbs = 364
"Vlachs" (Romanians) = 225
Romanians (self-declared) = 4
Croats = 1
undeclared = 42
unknown = 47

Politics

In 2004, the Romanian Orthodox Church, Malajnica, the first Romanian Church was built in eastern Serbia in two centuries. The Helsinki Committee for Human Rights in Serbia drew attention to the situation of the Romanian people living there, and to their right to preserve their national identity. The president of Romania Traian Băsescu visited the village on November 2, 2011.

Notable people
 Bojan Aleksandrović, vicar of Mălainița and Remesiana and presbyter of Dacia Ripensis.

References

External links
 Vizita a lui Basescu la Malajnica Serbia Negotin 2 noiembrie 2011
 Hramul Bisericii din Mălainița/ Sărbătoare românească în Valea Timocului la Biserica părintelui Boian Alexandrovici 
 President of Romania, Traian Basescu in Negotin, Malajnica, with Romanians from the Timok

 
Populated places in Bor District